In their second season in the National Association, the  1875 Hartford Dark Blues finished in third place. They were managed by starting third baseman Bob "Death to Flying Things" Ferguson.

The Dark Blues, with future Hall of Famer Candy Cummings, had the best pitching staff in baseball. Cummings won 35 games, and the 19-year-old Tommy Bond finished second in league ERA at 1.56.

Following the season, they were one of the NA teams chosen to join the new National League.

Regular season

Season standings

Record vs. opponents

Roster

Player stats

Batting

Starters by position
Note: Pos = Position; G = Games played; AB = At bats; H = Hits; Avg. = Batting average; HR = Home runs; RBI = Runs batted in

Other batters 
Note: G = Games played; AB = At bats; H = Hits; Avg. = Batting average; HR = Home runs; RBI = Runs batted in

Pitching

Starting pitchers
Note: G = Games pitched; IP = Innings pitched; W = Wins; L = Losses; ERA = Earned run average; SO = Strikeouts

Relief pitchers
Note: G = Games pitched; W = Wins; L = Losses; SV = Saves; ERA = Earned run average; SO = Strikeouts

League leaders
Tommy Bond
 #2 in NA in ERA (1.56)

Candy Cummings
 #3 in NA in wins (35)
 #3 in NA in ERA (1.60)

References

1875 Hartford Dark Blues season at Baseball Reference

Hartford Dark Blues seasons
1875 in baseball
Hartford